Umanosuke is a masculine Japanese given name.

Possible writings
Umanosuke can be written using different combinations of kanji characters. Here are some examples:

馬之助, "horse, of, help"
馬之介, "horse, of, mediate"
馬之輔, "horse, of, help"
馬之丞, "horse, of, help"
馬之甫, "horse, of, begin"
午之助, "sign of the horse, of, help"
午之介, "sign of the horse, of, mediate"
午之輔, "sign of the horse, of, help"
午之丞, "sign of the horse, of, help"
午之甫, "sign of the horse, of, begin"
宇摩之助, "universe, polish, of, help"
宇摩之介, "universe, polish, of, mediate"

The name can also be written in hiragana うまのすけ or katakana ウマノスケ.

Notable people with the name
, Japanese anime director
Umanosuke Takagi (高木 午之助, 1656–1746), Japanese samurai.
, Japanese professional wrestler

Japanese masculine given names